Juruti may refer to:

Tucano language of Brazil
Juruti, Brazil, a Brazilian city